Breached is an action puzzle video game, developed Drama Drifters and published by Nkidu Games.

The game received mixed reviews from video game critics.

Gameplay
Breached is an action puzzle video game. Set in 2245, players take the role of Corus Valott, who wakes up from cryogenic sleep to find his base destroyed.

Development
Breached was developed by Drama Drifters and published by Nkidu Games. It was released on June 22, 2016.

Reception

Breached received mixed reception, with review aggregator Metacritic calculating an average score of 54 out of 100, based on 17 reviews.

Noah Caldwell-Gervais, writing for Polygon praised the game for its storytelling while criticizing the "triviality" of its gameplay.

Don Saas from GameSpot gave a negative review of the game, criticizing the controls and describing the mystery in the game as "shallow".

John Walker from Rock, Paper, Shotgun noted play-throughs of the game could last one or two hours.

References

External links

 

Science fiction video games
Windows games